Sergio Rodríguez Gómez (born 12 June 1986) is a Spanish professional basketball player for Real Madrid of the Spanish Liga ACB and the EuroLeague. Rodriguez, nicknamed "El Chacho", won the EuroLeague title in 2015, and was an All-EuroLeague First Team selection, as well as the EuroLeague MVP the year before.

Rodríguez is a regular member of the senior Spain national team, with whom he won a FIBA World Cup title in 2006, an Olympics silver medal in 2012, as well as a bronze medal at the 2016 Summer Olympics. He also won a EuroBasket title in 2015, a silver medal in 2007, and a bronze medal in 2013. He earned an All-EuroBasket Team selection in 2015.

Professional career

Estudiantes (2003–2006)
Prior to joining the Portland Trail Blazers, Rodríguez was chosen to play for the 2004 World Junior Select team to play against the best high school players at the Nike Hoop Summit, located in the United States. Before joining the NBA, Rodríguez also played professional basketball at the senior club level for Estudiantes of the Spanish League, in which he played a final against FC Barcelona in the 2003–04 season, and won the ACB Rising Star Award for the 2004–05 season.

Portland Trail Blazers (2006–2009)

Rodríguez was selected with the 27th pick in the first round, by the Phoenix Suns, in the 2006 NBA draft (and later that day traded to the Portland Trail Blazers in exchange for cash considerations). On July 20, 2006, it was announced that the Trail Blazers had negotiated a buyout with his Spanish League club Estudiantes, and signed him to an NBA rookie-scale contract.

Throughout his spell at Portland, he did not earn much playing time, primarily playing as back-up point-guard. He was sidelined by the likes of Jarrett Jack or Steve Blake, who were favoured by coach Nate McMillan. He developed great court chemistry with fellow Spaniard Rudy Fernández.

Rodríguez did not get along with McMillan, who had had a profile of low-risk point guard in his playing career. In the view of Rodríguez, McMillan was more "unjust than just" towards him, although—conveying a mixed balance—he pointed out that McMillan still gave him some opportunities after the arrival of highly touted prospect Jerryd Bayless. Retrospectively, McMillan shared the opinion that Rodríguez had entered the NBA "too young", allegedly undeveloped as player.

Sacramento Kings and New York Knicks (2009–2010)
On June 25, 2009, Rodríguez was traded, along with the 37th pick in the 2009 NBA draft, and cash considerations, to the Sacramento Kings for the 31st pick in the 2009 NBA draft. In 39 games played for the Kings, he averaged 6 points and 3.1 assists per game.

On February 18, 2010, Rodríguez was traded to the New York Knicks, along with Tracy McGrady, in a 3-team trade deal. He appeared in 27 games for the Knicks, averaging 7.4 points and 3.4 assists per game.

Real Madrid (2010–2016)

On July 5, 2010, after spending four seasons in the NBA, Rodríguez signed a 3-year contract with the Spanish team Real Madrid. In July 2012, he signed a 2-year contract extension with Real Madrid, extending his contract through the 2014–15 season.

On January 9, 2014, he signed an extension with Real Madrid, staying in the club until 2018. In May 2014, alongside his teammate Rudy Fernández, he was named to the All-EuroLeague First Team of the EuroLeague. Prior to the 2014 Final Four, he was named the EuroLeague MVP of the season, after averaging 14 points, 4.9 assists, and 2 rebounds per game,  over 31 games played, despite not starting in any game.

In the 2014–15 season, Real Madrid won the EuroLeague, after defeating Olympiacos, by a score of 78–59 in the 2015 finals game. Real Madrid eventually finished the season by also winning the season's Spanish League championship, after a 3–0 series sweep in the Spanish League's final series against Barcelona. With that title win, Real Madrid won the triple crown.

Philadelphia 76ers (2016–2017)
On 13 July 2016, Rodríguez signed with the Philadelphia 76ers. He made his debut for the 76ers in their season opener on 26 October 2016, recording 12 points and nine assists in a 103–97 loss to the Oklahoma City Thunder. On April 8, 2017, Rodriguez was ruled out for the final three games of the season due to knee soreness after playing 68 games and starting a career high 30 games for the franchise.

CSKA Moscow (2017–2019)
On July 17, 2017, Rodríguez signed with CSKA Moscow. In May 2018, he was named the All-EuroLeague Second Team for the 2017–18 season.

Olimpia Milano (2019–2022)
On July 12, 2019, Rodriguez signed a three-year deal with the Italian basketball team, Pallacanestro Olimpia Milano. In his first game with Milano, Rodriguez recorded 21 points and 4 assists in a 75–53 win over the De' Longhi Treviso. On July 2, 2022, Rodriguez amicably parted ways with the Italian club after three seasons, having also served as the team's captain.

Return to Real Madrid (2022–present)
On July 18, 2022, Rodriguez returned to Real Madrid on a one-year deal.

National team career

Thought to be one of the best European prospects of his age, Rodríguez was named the MVP of the 2004 FIBA Europe Under-18 Championship, which was held in Zaragoza, Spain, while playing with the Spain national junior team. He led the host Spanish team to the tournament's gold medal. In the eight games of that tournament, he averaged 19 points per game, 4.6 rebounds per game, 8.5 assists per game, and 2.1 steals per game.

In August 2006, Rodríguez won the gold medal at the 2006 FIBA World Championship, while playing with the senior men's Spain national team. He also won the silver medal with Spain's senior national team at the EuroBasket 2007. In 2012, he won a silver medal at the Summer Olympics in London. In 2016, he won a bronze medal at the Summer Olympic Games in Rio de Janeiro.

Rodríguez decided to skip the 2019 World Cup, citing a need to rest. He was called up by Sergio Scariolo for the 2020 Summer Olympics, celebrated in 2021.

Player profile 
An adept to pick and roll plays and with a flair for passing, Rodríguez has mastered the art of feeding athletic big-men and small-forwards with alley-oops. Owing to his passing ability and flashy dribbling, he drew comparisons to Jason Williams. Throughout his Euroleague career he has had a high assist per turnover ratio and he has also excelled as scorer, presenting high 3-point field-goal and free-throw percentages.

Career statistics

NBA

Regular season

|-
| align="left" | 
| align="left" | Portland
| 67 || 1 || 12.9 || .423 || .282 || .808 || 1.4 || 3.3 || .5 || .0 || 3.7
|-
| align="left" | 
| align="left" | Portland
| 72 || 0 || 8.7 || .352 || .293 || .658 || .8 || 1.7 || .3 || .0 || 2.5
|-
| align="left" | 
| align="left" | Portland
| 80 || 13 || 15.3 || .392 || .325 || .792 || 1.6 || 3.6 || .7 || .0 || 4.5
|-
| align="left" | 
| align="left" | Sacramento
| 39 || 0 || 13.3 || .463 || .357 || .694 || 1.3 || 3.1 || .7 || .1 || 6.0
|-
| align="left" | 
| align="left" | New York
| 27 || 8 || 19.7 || .491 || .347 || .806 || 1.4 || 3.4 || .8 || .1 || 7.4
|-
| align="left" | 
| align="left" | Philadelphia
| 68 || 30 || 22.3 || .392 || .365 || .667 || 2.3 || 5.1 || .7 || .1 || 7.8
|- class="sortbottom"
| style="text-align:left;"| Career
| style="text-align:left;"|
| 353 || 52 || 15.0 || .409 || .337 || .739 || 1.5 || 3.4 || .6 || .0 || 4.9

Playoffs

|-
| align="left" | 2009
| align="left" | Portland
| 5 || 0 || 5.4 || .333 || .000 || .000 || .6 || 1.4 || .0 || .2 || .8
|- class="sortbottom"
| style="text-align:left;"| Career
| style="text-align:left;"|
| 5 || 0 || 5.4 || .333 || .000 || .000 || .6 || 1.4 || .0 || .2 || .8

EuroLeague

|-
| style="text-align:left;"| 2004–05
| style="text-align:left;"| Estudiantes
| 14 || 5 || 17.4 || .419 || .318 || .636 || 1.9 || 2.8 || 1.2 || .0 || 6.4 || 5.7
|-
| style="text-align:left;"| 2010–11
| style="text-align:left;" rowspan=6| Real Madrid
| 18 || 10 || 18.8 || .413 || .200 || .938 || 1.9 || 3.1 || .5 || .0 || 6.1 || 6.2
|-
| style="text-align:left;"| 2011–12
| 16 || 5 || 20.1 || .494 || .469 || .821 || 1.5 || 5.4 || .8 || .0 || 7.4 || 9.9
|-
| style="text-align:left;"| 2012–13
| 29 || 4 || 18.2 || .374 || .295 || .875 || 1.8 || 3.9 || .7 || .0 || 7.5 || 7.2
|-
| style="text-align:left;"| 2013–14
| 31 || 0 || 22.5 || .498 || .500 || .906 || 2.0 || 4.9 || 1.2 || .1 || 14.0 || 15.9
|-
| style="text-align:left;background:#AFE6BA;"| 2014–15†
| 28 || 2 || 21.6 || .438 || .381 || .836 || 1.4 || 5.1 || 1.0 || .0 || 11.1 || 12.1
|-
| style="text-align:left;"| 2015–16
| 27 || 10 || 23.9 || .446 || .409 || .741 || 2.2 || 6.2 || .7 || .1 || 10.9 || 14.0
|-
| style="text-align:left;"| 2017–18
| style="text-align:left;" rowspan=2| CSKA Moscow
| 36 || 22 || 26.0 || .491 || .438 || .897 || 2.0 || 4.9 || .8 || .1 || 13.8 || 13.8
|-
| style="text-align:left;background:#AFE6BA;"| 2018–19†
| 35 || 10 || 21.9 || .420 || .392 || .878 || 1.5 || 4.5 || .7 || .1 || 10.2 || 9.1
|- class="sortbottom"
| style="text-align:left;"| Career
| style="text-align:left;"|
| 199 || 58 || 21.4 || .454 || .410 || .842 || 1.9 || 4.7 || .9 || .0 || 10.4 || 11.1

Domestic leagues

Awards and accomplishments

Professional career
 3× Liga ACB (Spanish League) Champion: (2013, 2015, 2016)
 4× Copa del Rey (Spanish Cup) winner: (2012, 2014, 2015, 2016)
 3× Supercopa de España (Spanish Supercup) winner: (2012, 2013, 2014)
 EuroLeague Champion: (2015, 2019)
 FIBA Intercontinental Cup Champion: (2015)
 Spanish ACB League Rising Star Award: (2005)
 3× All-Spanish ACB League Team: (2013, 2014, 2016)
 Spanish Supercup MVP: (2013)
 All-EuroLeague First Team: (2014)
 EuroLeague MVP: (2014)
 Spanish ACB League Most Spectacular Player of the Year (KIA Award): (2014).
 Best Spanish ACB League Passer: (2013–14).
 2× All-Europe Player of the Year: (2014, 2015)
 VTB United League champion: (2018)
 VTB United League Final Four MVP: (2018)

Spanish junior national team
 2004 FIBA Europe Under-18 Championship: 
 2004 FIBA Europe Under-18 Championship MVP:

Spanish senior national team
 2006 FIBA World Championship: 
 EuroBasket 2007: 
 2012 Summer Olympics:  Silver
 EuroBasket 2013: 
 EuroBasket 2015: 
 EuroBasket 2015: All-Tournament Team
 2016 Summer Olympics:  Bronze

References

External links

 
 Sergio Rodríguez at acb.com 
 Sergio Rodríguez at euroleague.net
 Sergio Rodríguez – 2004 European Championship for Men U18 at FIBA.com
 
 
 
 

1986 births
Living people
2006 FIBA World Championship players
2014 FIBA Basketball World Cup players
Basketball players at the 2012 Summer Olympics
Basketball players at the 2016 Summer Olympics
Basketball players at the 2020 Summer Olympics
CB Estudiantes players
FIBA EuroBasket-winning players
FIBA World Championship-winning players
Liga ACB players
Medalists at the 2012 Summer Olympics
Medalists at the 2016 Summer Olympics
National Basketball Association players from Spain
New York Knicks players
Olimpia Milano players
Olympic basketball players of Spain
Olympic bronze medalists for Spain
Olympic medalists in basketball
Olympic silver medalists for Spain
PBC CSKA Moscow players
People from San Cristóbal de La Laguna
Sportspeople from the Province of Santa Cruz de Tenerife
Philadelphia 76ers players
Phoenix Suns draft picks
Point guards
Portland Trail Blazers players
Real Madrid Baloncesto players
Sacramento Kings players
Spanish expatriate basketball people in Italy
Spanish expatriate basketball people in Russia
Spanish expatriate basketball people in the United States
Street basketball players